The World Figure Skating Championships is an annual event sanctioned by the International Skating Union in which figure skaters compete for the title of World Champion.

The competition took place from 23 to 24 February in Berlin, German Empire.

Results

Judges:
 Kustermann 
 K. Ebhardt 
 K. Dorasil 
 M. Rendschmidt 
 C. Gützlaff

Sources
 Result List provided by the ISU

World Figure Skating Championships
World Figure Skating Championships, 1904
World 1904
World Figure Skating Championships, 1904
1900s in Berlin
February 1904 sports events
1904 in German sport